Severe Tropical Cyclone Joan was an intense tropical cyclone that ravaged areas of Western Australia. Forming out of a tropical low on 30 November 1975, Joan gradually intensified as it tracked towards the west. After attaining Category 5 intensity on 5 December, the storm abruptly began to track southward and accelerated. The following day, the cyclone reached its peak intensity with winds of 215 km/h (130 mph) and a barometric pressure of 915 hPa (27.02 inHg). Joan only weakened slightly before making landfall in the vicinity of Mundabullagana. The cyclone rapidly weakened after landfall before dissipating over Western Australia on 12 December.

Although no fatalities resulted from Joan, the cyclone caused widespread destruction across areas of Western Australia. In Port Hedland, most of the structures were damaged as a result of the storm. In addition, 1,000 homes in the town were damaged or destroyed. Further inland, record rainfall caused widespread flooding in many areas, causing many rivers and streams to overflow. Due to the severity of the storm, the name Joan was retired after the season.

Meteorological history

Cyclone Joan originated from a mass of convection that formed northwest of Darwin on 30 November 1975. Due to its possibility of tropical development, the Australian Bureau of Meteorology began to monitor the system, issuing a tropical cyclone alert on the same day. Tracking southwest, the system gained organization, at which time it received the name Joan on the next day. As Joan progressed to the southwest, it steadily intensified in favorable conditions, strengthening into a Category 1 tropical cyclone on the Australian tropical cyclone intensity scale on the same day.

Joan continued to steadily intensify as it moved to the southwest, attaining Category 3 status on 2 December, classifying Joan as a severe tropical cyclone. On the next day, the forward motion of the storm slowed as while it passed to the north of Rowley Shoals, before abruptly turning towards the south, toward the Australian coast. Joan reached its peak intensity on 7 December, as it was moving south, with maximum wind speeds of 215 km/h (130 mph) and a minimum barometric pressure of 915 hPa (mbar; 27.02 inHg), based on Dvorak satellite intensity estimates.

After making landfall, the cyclone steadily weakened over land as it passed over areas of Western Australia. However, after crossing the Hamersley Range on 8 December, Joan began a phase a rapid weakening, and by the end of the day, its maximum sustained wind was only . The system became merged with a broad low pressure area the next day before dissipating on 10 December. However, the Bureau of Meteorology continued to track the storm until 12 December.

Preparations and impact
Prior to making landfall on Western Australia, six tropical cyclone alerts and 63 cyclone warnings were issued by the Bureau of Meteorology on Joan. The most severe type, the second cyclone warning phase, began to be initiated in three hour intervals beginning on 6 December after Joan made an abrupt turn towards the south. A total of 23 warnings were issued in the second cyclone warning phase. All locations along the coast from Kuri Bay to Exmouth were issued a tropical cyclone alert or warning at least once during the duration of Cyclone Joan.

However, since this occurred during lower tides, inundation of inland areas was not as severe as past tropical cyclones affecting the Port Hedland area. An estimated 85% of houses on Port Hedland were destroyed, with all structures near the coast being damaged to some degree. An estimated 1,000 houses were destroyed in the town due to Joan. 50 families in Port Hedland were left homeless as a result of the cyclone.

Further inland flooding resulted from heavy rains dropped by a weakening Joan. Rainfall peaked at  near the Marandoo mine. Multiple locations recorded either near 24-hour rainfall records or broke the previous 24-hour rainfall records. Flooded streams resulted in washaways along railway lines. In addition the Yule River was flooded by the heavy rains. The total repair cost of damages caused by floods in the Pilbara region totaled to A$1.5 million (US$1.9 million). Food supply to Wittenoom became drastically limited after several roads were washed away.  It was estimated that the return periods of the floods caused by Joan were in excess of 50 years.

Total damages from the storm were estimated to be at least A$25 million (US$31 million), although no casualties were reported as a result of Cyclone Joan.  Due to the severity of the storm, the name Joan was retired after the season.

See also

List of cyclones in Western Australia
List of most intense tropical cyclones
Cyclone Alessia (2013)
Cyclone Tracy

Notes

References

External links

Joan
Joan
Retired Australian region cyclones
1975 in Australia
1974–75 Australian region cyclone season